Satrio Piningit (Gedrik Javanese: Satriå Pininģit, Javanese Hanacaraka:  ꦱꦠꦿꦶꦪꦺꦴꦥꦶꦤꦶꦔꦶꦠ꧀; meaning "Solitude Knight / Solitude Kshatriya") or also called Ratu Adil (Javanese Hanacaraka: ꦫꦠꦸꦄꦢꦶꦭ꧀, Indonesian: Raja yang Adil; meaning "King of Justice") is a Javanese apocalyptic main character of Jongko Joyobhoyo (Jayabaya Prophecies) in Javanese myths by which considered as one who would become a Great Leader of Nusantara (modern-day Indonesia) and ruling the world from Java. In other traditions around the world, Satrio Piningit has a similar other apocalyptic characters as Messiah (Judaism and Christianity), Maitreya (Buddhism), or related to Imam Mahdi prophecy in Islam.

Jongko Joyoboyo (Jayabaya Prophecies)

Maharaja Jayabaya was a King of Kediri in East Java from 1135 to 1157 A.D. and he was known for his righteousness and prosperous, coupled with reputed to have been an incarnation of the Hindu deity, Vishnu (Javanese: Dhewo Wisnu / ꦢꦼꦮꦺꦴꦮꦶꦱ꧀ꦤꦸ, Indonesian: Dewa Wisnu) so that he had a sort of magical strength (in which Javanese called sakti manduroguno). He is also believed that able to predict the future.

Maharaja Jayabaya is the most famous for his oracles, most prophesies were attributed to him names the Serat Joyobhoyo Musoror, Serat Pranitiwekyo, and the rests are debatable amongst scholars. Jayabaya is also attributed as author of the "Pralembang Joyobhoyo", a prophetic book which played an important role on mind control in the Japanese Occupation of Indonesia (1942–1945).

According to a selectively abridged set of stanzas within a Jayabaya prophesy (those all are extremely long epic poems):
"The Javanese would be ruled by whites for 3 centuries and by yellow dwarfs for the life span of a maize plant prior to the return of the Ratu Adil: whose the name must contain at least one syllable of the Javanese Noto Nogoro."

When Japan occupied the Dutch East Indies, in the first weeks of 1942, Indonesians came down in the streets shouting out to the Japanese army as the fulfillment of the prophecy ascribed to Joyoboyo, who foretold the day when white men would one day establish their rule on Java and tyrannize the people for hundreds years – but they would be driven out by the arrival of yellow men from the north. These yellow dwarfs, Joyoboyo had predicted, would remain for one crop cycle, and after that Java would be freed from foreign domination. To most of the Javanese, Japan was a liberator: the prophecy had been fulfilled.

Jayabaya Prophecy of Satrio Piningit

King Jayabaya predicted that Satrio Piningit would become a Great Leader of Nusantara. He wrote down that Satrio Piningit is a descendant of Majapahit's royal family, he was an Intelligent King, Honest, and Righteous. He would uphold justice around the world from Java (in the beginning, he will conquer Nusantara before it) so that he is also called as "Ratu Adil" (Indonesian: King of Justice, in Javanese, "Ratu" means "King" or "Queen").

According to Jayabaya, in the course of Satrio Piningit's life, he always has got a lot experience of miseries, always be humiliated, unlucky, and "kesapar" (poor). Therefore, he has got a nickname "Satrio Wiragung" (The Great Ksatria) due to his sincerity. Most Javanese people believe this prophecy.

Satrio Piningit would not have served as a kind of Head of State (President or King) but greater than it. He would surely conquer the world before the end of the world. He would not be elected from the election, and never asks for elected. In other words, he would lead a massive revolution. Uniquely, in the last verses of Jongko Joyobhoyo, there is written the verses about the coming of Satrio Piningit which told about disasters before Satrio Piningit coming day and it is also stereotypically considered as post-apocalyptic world.

Some Verses About Satrio Piningit

꧇꧑꧔꧐꧇꧉ꦥꦺꦴꦭꦲꦼꦮꦺꦴꦁꦗꦺꦴꦮꦺꦴꦏꦺꦴꦪꦺꦴꦒꦧꦃꦢꦷꦤ꧀ꦠꦺꦫꦶ꧈ꦲꦺꦤ꧀ꦢꦶꦱꦶꦁꦧꦺꦤꦺꦂꦲꦺꦤ꧀ꦢꦶꦱꦶꦁꦱꦺꦗꦠꦶ꧈ꦥꦺꦴꦫꦺꦴꦠꦺꦴꦥꦺꦴꦥꦺꦴꦢꦺꦴꦲꦺꦴꦫꦮꦤꦶ꧈ꦥꦺꦴꦢꦺꦴꦮꦺꦢꦶꦔꦗꦫꦏꦼꦥꦶꦮꦸꦭꦁꦲꦢꦶ꧈ꦱꦭꦃꦱꦭꦃꦲꦤꦺꦩꦤꦶꦥꦠꦶ꧉

140. polahe wong Jowo koyo gabah diinteri, endi sing bener endi sing sejati, poro topo podo ora wani, podo wedi ngajarake piwulang adi, salah-salah anemani pati.

translation:

the behavior of Javanese is such grain sowing, no one true, no one real, all hermits dare not, afraid to express the true teachings, the death wilt actually cometh those folk up.

꧇꧑꧔꧑꧇꧉ꦧꦚ꧀ꦗꦶꦂꦧꦤ꧀ꦢꦁꦲꦺꦴꦤꦺꦴꦔꦺꦤ꧀ꦢꦶꦲꦺꦤ꧀ꦢꦶ꧈ꦒꦸꦤꦸꦁꦚ꧀ꦗꦺꦧ꧀ꦭꦸꦒ꧀ꦠꦤ꧀ꦲꦚ꧀ꦗꦂꦮꦤꦶ꧈ꦠꦤ꧀ꦲꦔꦶꦩ꧀ꦥꦺꦤꦶ꧈ꦒꦺꦃꦠꦶꦔꦼꦏꦺꦥꦠꦶꦥꦠꦶꦩꦫꦁꦥꦤ꧀ꦢꦶꦠꦺꦴꦏꦁꦲꦺꦴꦊꦃꦥꦠꦶꦒꦺꦤꦶ꧈ꦩꦂꦒꦺꦴꦮꦺꦢꦶꦏꦥꦶꦪꦏ꧀ꦮꦺꦢꦶꦤꦼꦱꦺꦴꦥꦺꦴꦱꦶꦫꦺꦴꦱꦶꦁꦱꦪꦺꦏ꧀ꦠꦶ꧉

141. banjir bandhang ono ngendhi-endhi, gunung njeblug tan anjarwani, tan angimpeni, gehtinge kepati-pati marang pandito kang oleh pati geni, margo wedhi kapiyak wedhine sopo siro sing sayekti.

translation:

flash floods occur in everywhere, mounts erupt suddenly, thither is no notification, it all very much hates a false meditate priest without eating and sleeping, because the priest is afraid his secret would beest uncovered.

Sort, characteristics of Satrio Piningit is told at chapter 159 (and this story is also told on Wayang Story):

꧇꧑꧕꧙꧇꧉ꦱꦺꦭꦺꦠ꧀ꦱꦺꦭꦺꦠꦼꦪꦼꦤ꧀ꦩ꧀ꦧꦺꦱꦸꦏ꧀ꦔꦚ꧀ꦕꦶꦏ꧀ꦠꦸꦠꦸꦥꦶꦁꦠꦲꦸꦤ꧀꧈ꦱꦶꦤꦸꦁꦏꦭꦤ꧀ꦢꦼꦮꦺꦴꦮꦺꦴꦭꦸ꧈ꦔꦺꦱ꧀ꦠꦺꦴꦩꦁꦒꦭꦤꦶꦁꦫꦠꦸ꧈ꦧꦏꦭ꧀ꦲꦺꦴꦤꦺꦴꦢꦼꦮꦺꦴꦔꦺꦗꦮꦤ꧀ꦠꦃ꧈ꦲꦥꦺꦔꦮꦏ꧀ꦩꦤꦸꦁꦱꦺꦴ꧈ꦲꦺꦴꦥꦺꦴꦱꦸꦂꦪꦺꦴꦥꦺꦴꦝꦺꦴꦧꦺꦠꦺꦴꦫꦺꦴꦏꦿꦺꦱ꧀ꦤꦺꦴ꧈ꦲꦮꦠꦏ꧀ꦧꦺꦴꦭꦺꦴꦢꦼꦮꦺꦴ꧈ꦲꦒꦺꦒꦩꦤ꧀ꦠꦿꦶꦱꦸꦭꦺꦴꦮꦼꦢꦺꦴ꧈ꦗꦶꦤꦺꦗꦼꦂꦮꦺꦴꦭꦏ꧀ꦮꦭꦶꦏꦶꦁꦗꦩꦤ꧀꧈ꦮꦺꦴꦁꦚꦶꦭꦶꦃꦩ꧀ꦨꦊꦏꦏꦼ꧈ꦮꦺꦴꦁꦲꦸꦠꦁꦩ꧀ꦧꦪꦉ꧈ꦲꦸꦠꦁꦚꦺꦴꦮꦺꦴꦚꦻꦴꦂꦚꦺꦴꦮꦺꦴ꧈ꦲꦸꦠꦁꦮꦶꦫꦁꦚꦻꦴꦂꦮꦶꦫꦁ꧉

159. selet-selete yen mbesuk ngancik tutuping tahun, sinungkalan dewo wolu, ngesto manggalaning ratu, bakal ono dewo ngejawantah, apengawak manungso, oposuryo podho Betoro Kresno, awatak Bolodewo, agegaman trisulo wedo, jinejer wolak-waliking jaman, wong nyilih mbhalekake, wong utang mbayare, utang nyawa bayar nyowo, utang wirang nyaur wirang.

translation:

at the latest, after the end of the year (before the end of the world), it would cometh down a god (dhewo/deva/dewa) who becometh the King who hath the human body, his face is like a Batara Krishna, his character is like a Baladewa, his weapon is Trisula Wedha, that is the signs of the changing times, each gent returneth their loans, payeth their debts, liveth for a liveth, shy for a shy.

And events before his advent, depicted at chapter 161:

꧇꧑꧖꧑꧇꧉ꦢꦸꦤꦸꦔꦤꦼꦲꦺꦴꦤꦺꦴꦱꦶꦏꦶꦭ꧀ꦫꦺꦢꦶꦭꦮꦸꦱꦶꦱꦶꦃꦮꦼꦠꦤ꧀꧈ꦮꦼꦠꦤꦺꦧꦺꦔꦮꦤ꧀ꦧꦚꦸ꧈ꦲꦤ꧀ꦢꦺꦢꦸꦏꦸꦃꦥꦶꦤ꧀ꦝꦺꦴꦫꦢꦺꦤ꧀ꦒꦠꦺꦴꦠ꧀ꦏꦺꦴꦕꦺꦴ꧈ꦲꦫꦸꦥꦺꦴꦥꦒꦸꦥꦺꦴꦤ꧀ꦢꦺꦴꦫꦺꦴꦠꦸꦤ꧀ꦢꦺꦴꦠꦶꦒꦺꦴ꧈ꦏꦺꦴꦪꦺꦴꦩꦤꦸꦁꦱꦺꦴꦲꦔ꧀ꦭꦺꦭꦺꦝꦺꦴ꧉

161. dunungane ono sikil redhi Lawu sisih wetan, wetane bengawan banyu, andhedukuh pindho Radhen Gatotkoco, arupa pagupon doro tundho tigo, koyo manungsa angleledho.

translation:

(Satrio Piningit) would cometh from the eastern foothill of Mount Lawu, east of the river (Bengawan), his house is like a Raden Gatotkaca's, like a three-layered pigeon cage, such human teasing.

Character Interpretation and Claimants

At the Japanese Occupation during World War II when Japanese Soldier overwhelmed and took over the Dutch East Indies rule in Sumatra and Java Island, most Javanese people believed that Japanese were the Awaited Satrio Piningit. Yet Japan ruled by way of oppressing the people. Besides, Satrio Piningit was a Javanese, not Japanese.

In post-independence, most Javanese people (until now) believe that Sukarno were Satrio Piningit. They claimed that Sukarno's character was quite similar to Satrio Piningit's. But most Indonesians do not believe it due to the prophecy by which Satrio Piningit would become a leader of the world, not only of Indonesia, and some Java-centric ethnical issues are also considered as rejection of the claim. And at the end of Sukarno's, Sukarno was treated kind of inhumanely by the New Order's Regime (1967–1998), starting from rejection of Sukarno's Nawaksara at MPRS court in 1966.

Recently some Javanese sociologists considered Joko Widodo (7th President of Indonesia) as Satrio Piningit which became debatable during presidential election. Some of his opponents argued that putting Joko Widodo as Satrio Piningit was just propaganda in order to pronounce the election winner.

Jayabaya's only tells about Satrio Piningit's rising from Java Island. He would lead Nusantara and the last, he would rule the world. Jayabaya does not tell about post-Satrio Piningit era which is considered as post-apocalyptic world, so that Satrio Piningit is just a mere open debatable interpretation. Interesting point, the Javanese believes Satrio Piningit should be formally taking a leadership office (such as king, or president).

See also
Kejawen
Maharaja Jayabaya
Wayang and Pewayangan
Culture of Indonesia
Javanese people
Messiah
Imam Mahdi
Kalki
Maitreya

References

Javanese mythology